Rodney Clark "Hot Rod" Hundley (October 26, 1934 – March 27, 2015) was an American professional basketball player and television broadcaster. Hundley was the number 1 pick of the 1957 NBA draft  by the Cincinnati Royals out of West Virginia University. In 2003, Hundley received the Curt Gowdy Media Award from the Naismith Memorial Basketball Hall of Fame.

Hundley's life revolved around the game of basketball. His love and talent for the game led him to achieve honors in high school and most notably during his college years. At West Virginia University, Hundley played to packed crowds at the Old Field House. His dribbling antics and daredevil maneuvers on the floor led to his popular nickname, "Hot Rod". He later became known as a broadcaster for the Utah Jazz.

Early life
Hundley was raised by various families in Charleston, West Virginia. In high school, Hundley lived alone.

A native of Charleston, West Virginia, Hundley showed evident talent for the game during his youth. At Charleston High School in West Virginia he averaged 30 points per game, breaking the state's four-year scoring record in just three years. He was offered many scholarships to universities.

College career
Hundley played for WVU from 1954 to 1957. The Mountaineers made their first NCAA appearance and three total appearances between 1955 and 1957. During his junior year, Hundley averaged 26.6 points and 13.1 rebounds per game. He scored more than 40 points in a game six times, which led to the Mountaineers scoring over 100 points in nine games. The Mountaineers were ranked No. 20 in the nation in 1955 and No. 4 in 1956. Hundley holds a varsity school record with 54 points in a single game against Furman and holds a freshman team record of 62 points against Ohio.

Sophomore season
As a sophomore in 1955, Hundley averaged 23.7 points per game and 8.1 rebounds in 30 games, 27 of which he started. Hundley scored 24 points against Wake Forest, then followed up with 30 against Alabama. He then scored another 47 points against Wake Forest two games later. He then followed up with 24 points against Cornell then 38 points against NYU. Two games later, he scored 35 points and grabbed 10 rebounds against Carnegie Tech. He then followed up three games later with 30 points against VMI. He then had 17 points against Virginia Tech and 25 points with 11 rebounds against Pittsburgh in the Backyard Brawl. He then had 35 points in a loss to Duke. He then had 21 against Penn State, 28 against Washington & Lee, 23 against William & Mary, and 35 points with 13 rebounds against Pitt. He followed the five-game stretch with 39 points and 10 rebounds against George Washington, then 25 points and 7 rebounds against Rutgers. He then had 27 points and 9 rebounds against VMI, 27 points and 12 rebounds against Washington & Lee, and then 30 points and 12 rebounds against George Washington.

In the Southern Conference tournament, Hundley had the opportunity to set the tournament scoring record with two free throws in the final seconds of a game against George Washington with the Mountaineers already having the game won. However, Hundley shot a hook shot and a behind-the-back shot that both resulted in air balls.

Junior season

As a junior in 1956, Hundley set a career-high with 26.6 points & 13.1 rebounds per game. Hundley's first six games of the season had scores of 34 points, 20 points, 27 points, 40 points, 20 points, and 21 points. He then had games of 23 points and 29 points against Columbia and Washington & Lee. He followed up with 17 points & 9 rebounds against Villanova, 25 points & 10 rebounds against La Salle, then a career-game of 24 points, 26 rebounds & 9 assists against VMI. He then had 28 points against Carnegie Tech and 29 points, 5 rebounds & 4 assists against Penn State. He followed it up with 29 points against Pittsburgh in the Backyard Brawl, 35 points & 6 rebounds against Furman, 28 points against VMI, and then 25 points & 24 rebounds against Richmond. He followed up with 25 points against Penn State and 28 points, 13 rebounds & 7 assists against Virginia Tech. He continued with 38 points against William & Mary, 40 points & 13 rebounds against St. John's, 31 points & 13 rebounds against William & Mary, and then 40 points & 7 rebounds against Pitt. He then had a season-high 42 points & 9 rebounds against Furman, then 26 points against Richmond.

Senior season
In his final collegiate season, in 1957, Hundley averaged 23.1 points and 10.5 rebounds per game. He began his senior season with 23 points and 9 rebounds in the first game, 25 points and 13 rebounds in the second game, and 28 points and 12 rebounds in the third game of the season. In the next contest against Penn State, Hundley scored 17 points and totaled 16 rebounds. He then had 25 points and 10 rebounds in the 83–82 upset over the Duke Blue Devils. He then had consecutive games of 24 points, the first with 9 rebounds and the second with 12. In the January 5 game against Furman, Hundley scored a career-high 54 points and grabbed 18 rebounds in the victory, a school record for points in a game. He followed the game up with a game of 32 points and then the following game with 34 points and 15 rebounds against Villanova. He then had three games of 21 points, 19 points and then 18 points. He then had a game of 30 points with 13 points against St. John's followed by a game of 34 points and 10 rebounds against VMI. He then had a five-game stretch of 32 points, 28 points, 23 points, 39 points, and 27 points and 20 rebounds.

Legacy
Hundley was the fourth player in NCAA history to score more than 2,000 points during his career—and he did it in three years, because freshman then could not play varsity basketball. He averaged 24.5 points and 10.6 rebounds per game for three seasons and finished his collegiate career with 2,180 points. He was a two-time, first team All-American and currently holds eight school records. He is one of only two Mountaineers to be drafted first overall in an NBA draft, with Mark Workman going first overall to the Milwaukee Hawks five years earlier in the 1952 NBA draft. Once on a trip back to West Virginia to play in a charity game at the WVU Coliseum, constructed more than 10 years after he left WVU, Rod was said to have told Basketball Hall of Famer and fellow WVU alumnus Jerry West: "I built this building." West retorted, "Yeah but I paid it off."

Hundley was also memorable in school history for his on-court antics. He was famous for dribbling the ball behind his back, spinning the ball on his finger, rolling it down his arm, and even going around his back. He also often took hook shots at the free throw line and also would hang off the rim waiting for a lob pass from a teammate.

In January 2010, WVU retired his number 33, making Hundley and West the only players in school history to be awarded the honor. On February 20, 2016, a bronze statue of him was unveiled outside the blue gate of the WVU Coliseum, joining the statue of West.

Professional career
In 1957, the Cincinnati Royals made Hundley the first pick of the NBA Draft and immediately traded his rights to the Minneapolis Lakers. Hundley and Mark Workman, who also attended West Virginia, (1957 NBA draft) are the only No. 1 overall draft picks to come from the same high school.

Hundley played for the Lakers in Minneapolis and Los Angeles from 1957 until 1963, averaging 8.4 points per game and recording over 1,400 assists. He also played in two All Star games. His best season came in the 1959–60 season, when he averaged 12.8 points, 5.3 rebounds, and 4.6 assists per game. On February 1, 1960, Hundley recorded a triple-double, a feat even more notable in his era, with 17 points, 10 rebounds, and 10 assists. On February 28, he scored a career high 33 points in a loss against the Philadelphia Warriors. That postseason, Hundley and the Lakers nearly made it back to the NBA Finals for the second year in a row, but lost in a tough seven-game series to Bob Pettit and the St. Louis Hawks in the Western Division Finals, where Hundley averaged 10.9 points, 6.6 rebounds, and 6.1 assists per game. The following year, during the 1960-61 NBA season, Hundley got teamed up with fellow Mountaineer legend Jerry West, as he was drafted in that year's draft.

Hundley finished his six-year professional career at age 28 (in 1963) due to his bad knees. His career totals were 3,625 points, 1,420 rebounds and 1,455 assists in his six seasons.

Broadcasting career
After his retirement, Hundley moved to the broadcast booth, working four seasons for the Phoenix Suns and four seasons for the Los Angeles Lakers. In the early 1970s, he also teamed with Dick Enberg to call syndicated college basketball for TVS. Hundley was an NBA announcer for five years for CBS, where he called four All-Star Games; he worked two All-Star Games on ABC Radio.

In 1974, Hundley became the first radio and television voice of the expansion New Orleans Jazz. He followed them to Salt Lake City in 1979, where he became as celebrated a broadcaster as he was a player. He was known for his rapid-fire style and sayings such as "from the parking lot" for a long-distance shot, or "with a gentle push and a mild arc and the old cowhide globe hits home" for a jump shot.

For many years, Hundley's broadcasts were simulcast on both television and radio, but the league forced the Jazz to end this practice starting with the 2005–2006 season, when Craig Bolerjack took over television duties. Hot Rod continued to provide the radio voice for the Jazz for four more seasons.  As the decade wore on, nearly all NBA teams eventually moved radio broadcasters from court-side to perches high above the court, and the strain on Hundley's surgically replaced hips and knees became too much for him to bear. He announced his retirement on April 24, 2009, effective at the end of the season.

After retirement, Hundley surfaced alongside Joel Meyers on KCAL's televised Lakers broadcasts as a fill-in color commentator for Stu Lantz.

In 2000, Hundley graduated from WVU with a bachelor's degree, 43 years after leaving his alma mater without a degree to play in the NBA. In 1982, he was on the NCAA Silver Anniversary All-America Team for distinguished service. In 1992, he was inducted into the WVU Sports Hall of Fame. He received the NBA's Distinguished Broadcaster award in 1994. In 2003, he received the Curt Gowdy Media Award from the Naismith Memorial Basketball Hall of Fame – the only former professional player to achieve such an honor. In June 2004, he was voted into the Utah Broadcast Hall of Fame. He co-authored the book Hot Rod Hundley: You Gotta Love It Baby in 1998 with Tom McEachin; Bill Libby also wrote a biographical book about Hundley, Clown: No. 33 in Your Program, No. 1 in Your Heart, in 1970.

A newspaper once incorrectly reported Hundley wrote a book entitled The Man With a Lot to Smile About, and other sources have persisted in repeating the error.

Film appearances
Hundley appeared in the 2006 movie Church Ball starring Fred Willard and Clint Howard. He had also been in talks for a movie that would have showcased his early childhood and basketball career.

Personal life and death
During the off-season, Hundley regularly conducted basketball clinics around the country and worked with charities in the Salt Lake City area until withdrawing from the public eye due to Alzheimer's disease in his final years. For a time, he also hosted the Hot Rod Hundley Celebrity Golf Tournament to benefit the Salt Lake Shriners Hospital.
 
Hundley died at the age of 80 in Phoenix, Arizona on March 27, 2015.

Honors

 In 1992, Hundley was inducted into the West Virginia University Sports Hall of Fame.
 Hundley received the NBA's Distinguished Broadcaster award in 1994.
 In 2003, Hundley received the Curt Gowdy Media Award from the Naismith Memorial Basketball Hall of Fame.
 In 2004,Hundley was inducted into the Utah Broadcast Hall of Fame.
 On January 23, 2010, Hundley's #33 Jersey was retired by West Virginia University. (After the halftime ceremony, Hundley took a basketball and made a hook shot to a standing ovation.)
 Hundley was inducted into the Southern Conference Hall of Fame in 2010.
 In 2016 a statue of Hundley was dedicated and placed outside the WVU Coliseum at West Virginia University.

Media
Hundley is the subject of "Hot Rod The Documentary, the Untold Story of Hot Rod Hundley." The documentary was production of Pikewood Creative.

References

External links

1934 births
2015 deaths
All-American college men's basketball players
American men's basketball players
Basketball players from West Virginia
Charleston High School (West Virginia) alumni
Cincinnati Royals draft picks
College basketball announcers in the United States
Los Angeles Lakers announcers
Los Angeles Lakers players
Minneapolis Lakers players
National Basketball Association broadcasters
National Basketball Association All-Stars
New Orleans Jazz announcers
Phoenix Suns announcers
Point guards
Shooting guards
Sportspeople from Charleston, West Virginia
Sportspeople from Salt Lake City
Utah Jazz announcers
West Virginia Mountaineers men's basketball players
Basketball players from Salt Lake City